Guadalupe Pass is a mountain pass in Culberson County, Texas. It is located just outside of Guadalupe Mountains National Park, Texas and is traversed by U.S. Highway 62-180 connecting El Paso, Texas with Carlsbad, New Mexico.

References

Mountain passes of Texas
Landforms of Culberson County, Texas
Transportation in Culberson County, Texas